The 1979–80 season of the Moroccan Throne Cup was the 24th edition of the competition.

Maghreb de Fès won the cup, beating Union de Sidi Kacem 1–0 in the final, played at the stade Roches Noires in Casablanca. Maghreb de Fès won the title for the first time in their history.

Tournament

Last 16

Quarter-finals

Semi-finals

Final 
The final took place between the two winning semi-finalists, Maghreb de Fès and Union de Sidi Kacem, on 18 July 1980 at the Stade Roches Noires in Casablanca.

Notes and references 

1979
1979 in association football
1980 in association football
1979–80 in Moroccan football